Ibero usually refers to things related to the Iberian Peninsula, including:

 Ibero-America, countries in the Americas which were formerly colonies of Spain or Portugal
 Ibero-Caucasian, proposed language family
 Ibero-Celtic, Celtic language and people of the Iberian Peninsula 
 Ibero-German, people of the Iberian Peninsula living in Germany
 Ibero-Maurisian, North African culture thought to have spread from the Iberian Peninsula
 Ibero-Romance, Romance languages that developed on the Iberian Peninsula

Other uses
 Ibero, town in Olza, Navarre, Spain
 Universidad Iberoamericana, Mexican university known as Ibero

See also